Contest is a 1932 German sports film directed by Erich Schönfelder and starring Manfred von Brauchitsch, Evelyn Holt, and Kurt Vespermann. It is set in the world of motor racing. It was the final film directed by Schönfelder.

The film's sets were designed by Artur Günther and Willi A. Herrmann. It was shot at the Babelsberg Studios and on location in Freiburg, at the Nürburgring and the AVUS in Berlin.

Plot 
Robert Wenck is a well-known racing driver who goes to Freiburg to take part in a car race that starts there. He is very much looking forward to the race, which will lead through the nearby mountains, because here he will meet his favorite opponent, Kurt Harder. However, this ongoing titular battle between the two rivals hasn't changed their friendship. During training, Wenck and Harder meet and also exchange private words. Wenck learns that his friend Harder recently got married. Robert is happy to accept Kurt's invitation to a seaside resort where newlywed Eva is staying.

During the race, Kurt has a technical glitch that forces him to retire. In a daring ride, Wenck then won the race. Harder has to go on to Italy and for this reason asks his old friend to drive up to the seaside resort and take care of Harder's wife Eva. Robert is amazed when he sees who Eva Harder is. It is none other than his former flame. For the sake of his racing, Wenck had once neglected Eva, so that she reoriented herself. Now that the two meet again, old feelings for each other resurface. Harder himself doesn't know anything about the former relationship between the two, but an old photograph of Robert and Eva leads him to believe that the two of them probably had something to do with each other. He immediately returns to Germany and drives to his wife. Great displeasure rises in him when he sees Wenck returning home with Eva from a joint car jaunt.

Kurt Harder now believes that Wenck wants to get the lost love back and declares their friendship over. Only some time later, during a race on the Nürburgring, do the two opponents meet again. A bitter fight ensues and Robert, who has worked his way up to the top, crashes his racing car and crashes against a rock face. Kurt immediately rushes to him and frees the opponent from the burning wreckage. His human commitment is rewarded, despite the loss of time, Kurt Harder is able to win the race and is on the winner's podium. Before the award ceremony can take place, he and his wife visit Wenck at his bedside. Kurt puts one of Eva's hands in the other Robert's, signaling that he is ready to give up his wife, since the two obviously still have a lot in common.

Cast

References

External links

1930s sports films
Films of the Weimar Republic
Films directed by Erich Schönfelder
UFA GmbH films
German auto racing films
German black-and-white films
Films set in Berlin
Films shot in Berlin
Films shot at Babelsberg Studios
1930s German films
1930s German-language films